The State Register of Heritage Places is maintained by the Heritage Council of Western Australia. , 335 places are heritage-listed in the Town of Bassendean, of which 13 are on the State Register of Heritage Places.

List
The Western Australian State Register of Heritage Places, lists the following 13 state registered places within the Town of Bassendean:

References

Bassendean